Ronald Anthony Mattes (born August 8, 1963, in Shenandoah, Pennsylvania) is a former American football offensive tackle who played for 7 seasons in the National Football League.  He was drafted by the Seattle Seahawks in the seventh round of the 1985 NFL Draft and also played for the Chicago Bears.  He played college football at the University of Virginia, and was also an Offensive Line Coach for UVA after his retirement from playing.  He is currently the offensive line coach for the North Carolina A&T Aggies.

References 

1963 births
Living people
American football offensive tackles
Virginia Cavaliers football players
Seattle Seahawks players
Chicago Bears players
Indianapolis Colts players
Players of American football from Pennsylvania
People from Shenandoah, Pennsylvania